Samuel Emerson "Slam" Bradley is a fictional character that has appeared in various comic book series published by DC Comics. He is a private detective who exists in DC's main shared universe. The character concept was created by DC Comics founder Malcolm Wheeler-Nicholson. The character was developed by collaboration of Jerry Siegel and Joe Shuster, who both later became more well known as the co-creators of Superman. As one of the first ever DC characters, the character first appears in the Golden Age of Comic Books in the anthology title Detective Comics, being introduced in the first issue.  He later commonly was associated with Batman and other spinoff Batman characters when revived.

Slam Bradley was portrayed in live-action by Kurt Szarka in the first season of the Arrowverse series Batwoman.

Creation 

Conceived by Malcolm Wheeler-Nicholson and developed by Superman creators Jerry Siegel and Joe Shuster, the character first appeared in Detective Comics #1 (March 1937) and is depicted as a hard bitten, tough private eye who loves working for dames, but prefers the platonic company of his boy sidekick "Shorty" Morgan. The character originally starred in his own stories during the Golden Age, and later was revived in supporting character roles.
Slam Bradley was originally outlined by Wheeler-Nicholson in a May 13, 1936 letter to Jerry Siegel, who had previously created with Joe Shuster DC's character Doctor Occult. The letter stated: "We need some more work from you. We are getting out at least one new magazine in July and possibly two. The first one is definitely in the works. It will contain longer stories and fewer. From you and Shuster we need sixteen pages monthly. We want a detective hero called 'Slam Bradley'. He is to be an amateur, called in by the police to help unravel difficult cases. He should combine both brains and brawn, be able to think quickly and reason cleverly and able as well to slam bang his way out of a bar room brawl or mob attack. Take every opportunity to show him in a torn shirt with swelling biceps and powerful torso ala Flash Gordon. The pages are to run the same size as New Comics but to contain eight panels a page instead of six."

Comics appearances

Golden Age of Comics
The character first appeared as one of several ongoing features, in the debut issue of Detective Comics – originally an anthology series – in March 1937. He debuted a year before Superman's first appearance, and two years before Batman would become the title's lead feature. The character's adventures continued as Batman was introduced in issue #27, continuing as a supporting feature until Detective Comics #152 (October 1949). According to Jess Nevins' Encyclopedia of Golden Age Superheroes, "He fights ordinary criminals, Yellow Perils, stage magicians, the Human Fly, creatures from the year Two Billion, the Man-Beast, and on at least one occasion space aliens."

Slam was replaced in Detective #153 by Roy Raymond, TV Detective. Bradley would not make another significant appearance for over 32 years and his sidekick Shorty Morgan disappeared completely.

The character was originally operating out of Cleveland, then later in New York City, Slam and his sidekick "Shorty" Morgan often had humorous, fight-filled adventures, often going undercover in various professions to catch their man. Though most stories had a mystery element, "Slam" was more likely to solve them with his fists than his brains.

Revival
The character reappeared in Detective Comics #500 (March 1981). In a story titled "The Too Many Cooks... Caper!", an aging Bradley joined other DC detectives, such as Jason Bard, Pow-Wow Smith, Roy Raymond, the Human Target, and Mysto, Magician Detective in solving the murder of a fellow retiring detective. The character returned again in Detective Comics #572 (the 50th anniversary issue), teaming up with detectives Batman, Robin, Elongated Man, and Sherlock Holmes.

He appeared in the Superman titles in the 1990s, working for the Metropolis Police Department. However, this incarnation of the character was short-lived. When an older Slam Bradley later appeared in Detective Comics, it was explained that the Metropolis character was Slam Bradley, Jr.

In 2001, writer Ed Brubaker and artist Darwyn Cooke revived the character in the four-part serial "Trail of the Catwoman" in Detective Comics #759-762. In this story, he investigates the death of Selina Kyle and in the process runs afoul of the Batman. This incarnation of the character is a former police officer in his late 50s who has always worked in Gotham City (contradicting the previous Cleveland, New York, and Metropolis settings). Bradley then became a supporting cast member in the Catwoman ongoing series. He reveals that he has a son, Sam Bradley Jr., on the Gotham City Police Department. Sam Jr. and Selina Kyle engaged in a romantic relationship that produced a child, Helena Kyle. The character appears in Darwyn Cooke's 2003/2004 DC: The New Frontier as a private investigator working alongside Detective John Jones, and in Cooke's Solo #5.

Slam made an appearance during a flashback in the story arc "Heart of Hush", where he was the primary detective in the murder of Thomas Elliot's father.

Bradley is the main protagonist in the 2022 Tom King/Phil Hester miniseries Gotham City: Year One, a story set in 1961 Gotham involving Slam with Bruce Wayne's grandparents.

Outside mainstream coninuity
Slam was featured in the out-of-continuity DC: The New Frontier. He also appeared in Legends of the Dark Knight #5, in which he had to team up with Batman to clear his name of a murder charge. This story was released digitally as Legends of the Dark Knight #11-13.

In other media
"Slam" Bradley appears in the Batwoman episode "How Queer Everything Is Today!" portrayed by Kurt Szarka. This version is a member of the Gotham City Police Department. He first appeared when Batwoman stopped a hacked train from crashing into a concrete wall. Those who saw them photographed together thought they were dating. A running gag is that there were comments that "Slam" Bradley had a similar appearance to Chris Evans. When the Crows and the GCPD arrived at Gotham Prep to evacuate the prom attendees before Alice's bombs went off, Batwoman used her cape to block the flames before it can hit Bradley. Afterwards, she told the press that she and Bradley aren't dating.

"Slam" Bradley appears in the direct-to-video animated film Justice League: The New Frontier, voiced by Jim Meskimen. He appears as John Jones's detective partner and helps him and the Batman save a young boy from a cult that worships the Centre.

Golden Age controversy
The character Slam Bradley has, from its early onset, been embedded in a history of racism, in which the character is juxtaposed against Yellow Peril caricatures.

References

External links
 The Grand Comics Database
 Slam Bradley at Don Markstein's Toonopedia. Archived from the original on March 6, 2015
 Article on Slam, along with some information on Biff Bradley

1937 comics debuts
1949 comics endings
1981 comics debuts
American comics adapted into films
Batman characters
Characters created by Jerry Siegel
Characters created by Joe Shuster
Comics adapted into animated films
Comics characters introduced in 1937
Detective comics
DC Comics male superheroes
Fictional American police detectives
Fictional characters from Cleveland
Fictional characters from New York City
Fictional private investigators
Golden Age superheroes
Racism in fiction
Race-related controversies in comics